Agdistis swakopi is a moth in the family Pterophoridae. It is known from Namibia.

References

Endemic fauna of Namibia
Agdistinae
Insects of Namibia
Moths of Africa
Moths described in 2009